Digital Data Storage (DDS) is a computer data storage technology that is based upon the Digital Audio Tape (DAT) format that was developed during the 1980s.  DDS is primarily intended for use as off-line storage, especially for generating backup copies of working data.

Design 
A DDS cartridge uses tape with a width of 3.81mm, with the exception of the latest formats, DAT-160 and DAT-320, both which use 8mm wide tape.  Initially, the tape was 60 meters (197 feet) or 90 meters (295 ft.) in length. Advancements in materials technology have allowed the length to be increased significantly in successive versions.  A DDS tape drive uses helical scan recording, the same process used by a video cassette recorder (VCR).

Backward compatibility between newer drives and older cartridges is not assured; the compatibility matrices provided by manufacturers will need to be consulted.  Typically drives can read and write tapes in the prior generation format, with most (but not all) also able to read and write tapes from two generations prior.  Notice in HP's article that newer tape standards do not simply consist of longer tapes; with DDS-2, for example, the track was narrower than with DDS-1.

At one time, DDS competed against the Linear Tape-Open (LTO), Advanced Intelligent Tape (AIT), VXA, and Travan formats. However, AIT, Travan and VXA are no longer mainstream, and the capacity of LTO has far exceeded that of the most recent DDS standard, DDS-320.

History 

 DDS-1 Stores up to 1.3 GB uncompressed (2.6 GB compressed) on a 60 m cartridge or 2 GB uncompressed (4 GB compressed) on a 90 m cartridge. The DDS-1 cartridge often does not have the -1 designation, as initially it was the only format, though cartridges produced since the introduction of DDS-2 may carry a -1 designation to distinguish the format from newer formats. A media recognition system was introduced with DDS-2 drives and cartridges to detect the medium type and prevent the loading of an improper medium. From 1993, DDS-1 tapes included the media recognition system marks on the leader tape—a feature indicated by the presence of four vertical bars after the DDS logo.
 DDS-2 Stores up to 4 GB uncompressed (8 GB compressed) on a 120 m cartridge.
 DDS-3 Stores up to 12 GB uncompressed (24 GB compressed) on a 125 m cartridge. DDS-3 uses PRML (Partial Response Maximum Likelihood) to minimize electronic noise for a cleaner data recording.
 DDS-4 DDS-4 stores up to 20 GB uncompressed (40 GB compressed) on a 150 m cartridge. This format is also called DAT 40.
 DAT 72 DAT 72 stores up to 36 GB uncompressed (72 GB compressed) on a 170 m cartridge. The DAT 72 standard was developed by HP and Certance. It has the same form-factor as DDS-3 and -4 and is sometimes referred to as DDS-5.
 DAT 160 DAT 160 was launched in June 2007 by HP, stores up to 80 GB uncompressed (160 GB compressed). A major change from the previous generations is the width of the tape. DAT 160 uses 8 mm wide tape in a slightly thicker cartridge while all prior versions use 3.81 mm wide tape. Despite the difference in tape widths, DAT 160 drives can load DAT-72 and DAT-40 (DDS-4) cartridges. Native capacity is 80 GB and native transfer rate was raised to 6.9 MB/s, mostly due to prolonging head/tape contact to 180° (compared to 90° previously). Launch interfaces were Parallel SCSI and USB, with SAS interface released later.
 DAT 320 In November 2009 HP announced the DAT-320 standard, which stores up to 160 GB uncompressed (marketed as 320 GB assuming 2:1 compression) per cartridge. Native transfer rate was raised to 12 MB/s.

Generations

Future 
The next format, Gen 8, was canceled.

See also 
 Data8
 Magnetic storage

References

External links 

 DAT Manufacturers Group
 ECMA-139 ISO/IEC 10777:1991, Specification of DDS. ECMA-139
 ECMA-146  ISO/IEC 11321:1992, Specification of DATA/DAT. ECMA-146
 ECMA-150  ISO/IEC 11557:1992, Specification of DDS-DC (DDS w/ compression). ECMA-150
 ECMA-151  ISO/IEC 11558:1992, Specification of DCLZ (compression algorithm). ECMA-151
 ECMA-170 ISO/IEC 12447:1993, Specification of DDS (for 60m and 90m tapes). ECMA-170
 ECMA-171 ISO/IEC 12448:1993, Specification of DATA/DAT-DC (for 60m and 90m tapes). ECMA-171
 ECMA-198 ISO/IEC 13923, Specification of DDS-2. ECMA-198
 ECMA-236 ISO/IEC 15521, Specification of DDS-3. ECMA-236
 ECMA-288 ISO/IEC 17462, Specification of DDS-4. ECMA-288

Computer storage tape media
Computer file formats